After the Game is a 1997 neo-noir drama/mystery film directed by Brewster MacWilliams and starring Frank Gorshin, Stanley DeSantis, Sam Anderson, Mike Genovese, Susan Traylor, and Robert Dubac. It is produced by Robert Peters and Roy Winnick. The screenplay was written by Brewster MacWilliams.

The film explores the themes of poker, revenge, deceit, lust and greed, and explores karma and the afterlife.

The DVD, titled The Last Hand, was issued in 2004.

Premise
Aging gambler Benny Walsh (played by Gorshin) dies in a suspicious car crash after the biggest poker win of his life. His son, Clyde (played by Dubac), comes to the Nevada town in search of answers. He discovers that each of his father's gambling buddies had ample reason to see him dead.

Cast
Frank Gorshin as Benny Walsh
Stanley DeSantis as Frank Bertini
Sam Anderson as Jimmy Walsh
Mike Genovese as Sam Kowalski
Susan Traylor as Veronica Kowalski
Richard Lineback as Slim, the Bartender
Donna Eskra as Dolly
Robert Dubac as Clyde Walsh
Lou Rawls as Morgue Attendant
Daniel Zacapa as Detective Garcia
Hudson Leick as Grace

External links
After the Game at the Internet Movie Database

1997 films
American neo-noir films
1990s mystery drama films
American mystery drama films
Films about gambling
1997 drama films
1990s English-language films
1990s American films